The Hackley Library is a historic library in Muskegon, Michigan. It was a gift to the school board from lumber baron Charles Hackley to the City of Muskegon Public Schools and opened in 1890. It is listed on the Michigan Register of Historic Places. The library is at 316 West Webster Avenue. The library also owns the historic Torrent House across the street where genealogy records are housed.

The Library is supported by the Friends of the Hackley Public Library.

It is owned by Muskegon Public Schools. It was built in 1889 and efforts are underway to preserve it.

Torrent House

The Torrent House is a 31-room mansion built in 1891-1892 for $250,000 for lumberman, alderman, justice of the peace, and 3-term mayor of Muskegon John Torrent (1833-1915). Torrent owned mills in Muskegon, Manistee, Ludington, Whitehall, Traverse City and Sault Ste. Marie. The residence has also housed a mortuary, hospital and been a local Red Cross headquarters. It was purchased by the city of Muskegon in 1972 to preserve it and avoid demolition. It is located at 315 West Webster Avenue. A Michigan Historical Marker is on site.

Renovations
A $1.2 million interior renovation and restoration project took place in 2014. A major renovation of the library including ramps for access, air conditioning system work, and energy efficiency improvements was undertaken in 2016.

Most of the library's funding comes from a mill tax.

Architectural features
The library features Louis Millet stained glass windows. The library used to get electricity from Hackley's sawmill. When it was not operating gas was used to light the library.

References

Libraries in Michigan
Libraries established in 1890
1890 establishments in Michigan
Buildings and structures in Muskegon, Michigan